The Court Square–23rd Street station is a New York City Subway station complex on the IND Crosstown Line, the IRT Flushing Line and the IND Queens Boulevard Line. The complex is located in the vicinity of One Court Square in Hunters Point and Long Island City, Queens, and is served by the 7, E, and G trains at all times; the M train on weekdays; and the <7> express train during weekdays in the peak direction.

The complex comprises three originally separate stations, formerly known as the 23rd Street–Ely Avenue station (Queens Boulevard Line), Long Island City–Court Square station (Crosstown Line), and 45th Road–Court House Square station (Flushing Line). The Flushing Line station was the first to open, in 1916. The Crosstown Line station opened in 1933, followed by the Queens Boulevard Line station in 1939.

Two passageways were built to connect the three stations. The first was built in 1990, following the opening of the Citigroup office tower at One Court Square. In December 2001, this passageway came into greater use when G trains started to terminate at Court Square. A second passageway was completed between the Crosstown and Flushing Line stations in 2011. The Crosstown and Flushing Line stations were renamed "Court Square" with the latter being made fully ADA-accessible. The Queens Boulevard Line station, which is not ADA-compliant, was renamed "Court Square–23rd Street".

History

IRT Flushing Line station 

In 1913, the New York City Public Service Commission formalized the Dual Contracts, specifying new lines or expansions to be built by the Interborough Rapid Transit Company (IRT) and the Brooklyn Rapid Transit Company. As part of the Dual Contracts, the IRT was to complete and open the Steinway Tunnel as part of the new Flushing subway line. The tunnel, running under the East River with trolley loops on both the Manhattan and Queens sides, had sat unused since 1907, when test runs had been performed in the then-nearly-complete tunnel. The route was to go from Times Square through the tunnel over to Long Island City and from there continue toward Flushing.

The first part of the future IRT Flushing Line, from Grand Central–42nd Street in Manhattan to Vernon–Jackson Avenues in Long Island City, opened in 1915 and was extended to Hunters Point Avenue in February 1916. The IRT's 45th Road–Court House Square station opened on November 5, 1916, as part of a two-stop extension of the line from Hunters Point Avenue to Queensboro Plaza.

The city government took over the IRT's operations on June 12, 1940. The IRT routes were given numbered designations in 1948 with the introduction of "R-type" rolling stock, which contained rollsigns with numbered designations for each service. The route from Times Square to Flushing became known as the 7. In 1949, the New York City Board of Transportation announced that the Flushing Line platforms would be lengthened to 11 IRT car lengths; the platforms were only able to fit nine 51-foot-long IRT cars beforehand. The platforms at the station were extended in 1955–1956 to accommodate 11-car trains. However, nine-car trains continued to run on the 7 route until 1962, when they were extended to ten cars. In 2005, the station was listed on the National Register of Historic Places.

IND stations 
In the late 1920s and early 1930s, the city-owned Independent Subway System (IND) constructed the first sections of the Crosstown and Queens Boulevard Lines. The Crosstown Line station at Court Square was the first Queens station on either line to be built; its structure was completed in July 1930, and the tilework and equipment were installed afterward. On August 19, 1933, the IND opened the Court Square station as part of the first leg of the IND Crosstown Line. The IND Queens Boulevard Line between Manhattan and Roosevelt Avenue opened that same day, with  trains (predecessor to today's G service) operating between Queens Plaza and Nassau Avenue in Brooklyn.

The Queens Boulevard Line station, provisionally called "21st Street/Van Alst Avenue," was constructed between 1931 and 1933 along with the original section of the line east to Roosevelt Avenue. Although the station had been completed, it was not opened alongside the rest of the line due to lack of demand perceived by the city Board of Transportation, which called the station a "dead" station. This was in spite of protests from local civic and industry leaders, due to the numerous factories in the surrounding area. By December 1933, the station was referred to as "Ely Avenue", likely to avoid confusion with the nearby station on the Crosstown Line. In September 1936, it was decided to complete the station as an in-fill station due to expanding commercial and industrial operations in the area, with tilework, staircases, and other equipment installed. The station was finished by 1938, but its opening was delayed once again due to alleged lack of demand, with calls to open the station to serve the Long Island City Courthouse, St. John's Hospital (now the site of One Court Square), and the newly opened Queensbridge Houses.

The Queens Boulevard Line station finally opened as 23rd Street–Ely Avenue on August 28, 1939, six years after the first section of the Queens Boulevard Line and the opening of Court Square station on the Crosstown line. Ely Avenue was the former name of 23rd Street until many named streets in the borough were given numbers by the Queens Topographical Bureau in 1915. Similarly, Van Alst Avenue is now 21st Street, while the former Nott Avenue is the present-day 44th Drive.

Connections and renovations 

In 1984, the Metropolitan Transportation Authority (MTA) planned to construct a transfer passageway between the Queens Boulevard and Crosstown Line stations as part of a planned connector between the Queens Boulevard Line and the IND 63rd Street Line. Around 1986, Citigroup (then Citicorp) agreed to fund the passageway, at a cost of $8.5 million, as part of a zoning requirement for the construction of the adjacent One Court Square tower, which was being built to allow Citicorp to split its operations between several different buildings.  Two of these buildings, Citigroup Center and 399 Park Avenue, were located near the Lexington Avenue–53rd Street station, the next stop southbound on the Queens Boulevard Line. However, that stop was located in Manhattan, across the East River from Queens. The company selected the Court Square site due to its proximity to the Queens Boulevard subway.

The building opened in 1989, with the passageway completed later on. In 2000, the MTA began designing a second in-system passageway between the Flushing and Crosstown Line stations. On December 16, 2001, the 63rd Street Line connector was opened and service on the Queens Boulevard Line was increased, requiring G trains to terminate at Court Square on weekdays. To compensate Crosstown riders going into Queens, a free out-of-system transfer to the Flushing Line station was created. In addition, moving walkways in the corridor between the Crosstown and Queens Boulevard Line platforms were installed in December 2001. The moving walkway was subsequently found to have limited benefits: it saved commuters an average of 9 seconds; was often out of service; and could only operate in one direction toward the Queens Boulevard Line platforms.

In October 2005, Citigroup announced they would be funding the passageway between the Flushing and Crosstown line stations, as a zoning requirement for the construction of the Court Square Two building. On March 17, 2011, the Queens Boulevard station was renamed to "Court Square–23rd Street". On June 3, 2011, the $47 million ADA-accessible connection between the Crosstown Line and Flushing Line stations was opened and the two stations were renamed "Court Square". Most of the project was funded by Citigroup, but $13.9 million was covered by the MTA. The Flushing Line station was closed from January 21 to April 2, 2012, to complete further renovations, including platform upgrades and alterations to the station's mezzanine to make the station fully ADA-compliant.

ADA accessibility for the Crosstown Line platform was funded as part of the 2015–2019 Capital Program. The elevator project was originally expected to begin in 2018. Two staircases between the IND Crosstown Line platform and the mezzanine are being widened and two new staircases are being added to provide additional capacity. After 2020, one of the new staircases would be replaced by an elevator, which would make the platform ADA-accessible. The removal of the moving walkways were also announced at this time, and the walkways were removed starting in June 2018.

In December 2019, the MTA announced that the Queens Boulevard Line platforms would become ADA-accessible as part of the agency's 2020–2024 Capital Program. With the construction of the Skyline Tower above the station in the late 2010s, its developer spent $17 million to construct a new entrance to the Queens Boulevard Line's westbound platform. , funding had been committed to the addition of an elevator to the Crosstown Line platforms. In December 2021, the MTA awarded a contract for the installation of elevators at eight stations, including the Crosstown Line platform at the Court Square station. , the project is scheduled to be completed in March 2023.

Station layout 

The station complex is located in Long Island City, in western Queens. It consists of three formerly separate stations along the IND Queens Boulevard Line, IND Crosstown Line, and IRT Flushing Line. There are several entrances to the complex, with two passageways within fare control connecting the stations. In addition, there is no direct connection between the Flushing and Queens Boulevard platforms.

Crosstown–Queens Boulevard Lines transfer passageway 
This passageway was originally planned in the 1980s to compensate for the planned reroute of the G service away from the Queens Boulevard line when the track connection from the Queens Boulevard Line to the 63rd Street Line was completed (which ultimately occurred in 2001). It was constructed in the 1990s after Citigroup opened its  office tower at One Court Square.

The passageway is split into two sections, and between these two sections is the full-time fare control area for the complex. The main fare control area has a ceiling with a skylight, as well as a turnstile bank, token booth, and two staircases. One has two escalators and goes up to south side of 44th Drive inside a Citibank location next to the tower, and the other is open weekdays only and leads to the entrance plaza of One Court Square. A set of escalators opposite the street stairs lead to the building's lobby.

Lining the walls of this passageway is Stream, a glass mosaic mural by Elizabeth Murray, which was installed in 2001. This is one of two murals Murray made for MTA Arts & Design; the other, Blooming, was installed at Lexington Avenue/59th Street.

Flushing–Crosstown Lines transfer passageway 
The second passageway, opened in June 2011, consists of two escalators, one elevator, and one staircase within a glass-enclosed structure that connects the underground Crosstown Line station and the elevated Flushing Line station at 45th Road. Between 2001 and 2011, this was a free out-of-system transfer that could be made using MetroCards. While the elevators make both passageways ADA-accessible, only the IRT Flushing Line platforms are fully ADA-accessible with elevators to platform level. Starting in 2020, one of the stairs to the IND Crosstown Line platform was to be demolished and replaced with an elevator.

IRT Flushing Line platforms

The Court Square station on the IRT Flushing Line is an elevated station. There are two side platforms and two tracks at the station. The station opened on November 5, 1916, as 45th Road–Court House Square.

The current platforms were installed in the 2012 renovations. They are composed of numerous panels of composite fiberglass resin, lighter than conventional concrete and designed to resist corrosion and thermal expansion. The platform edges are equipped with ADA-compliant tactile strips. Both platforms have beige windscreens that run along their entire lengths and brown canopies with green frames and support columns except for a small section at their north ends. Small sections of the windscreens are mesh, allowing a view into the local area.

Exits 
This station has an elevated station house beneath the tracks at the extreme south end. A single staircase from each platform goes down to a combined waiting area and crossunder, where a turnstile bank provides entrance and exit from the station. Near these staircases, one elevator leads from each platform to the mezzanine. Outside fare control, there is a token booth; an elevator and two staircases go down to the northwestern corner of 45th Road and 23rd Street. Two escalators and a staircase, located within an enclosed structure, lead directly to the complex's underground mezzanine area via a new transfer passageway. The northbound platform's elevator also leads to the underground mezzanine within fare control, stopping at the station house level but bypassing the street along the way. The southbound platform's elevator only connects that platform to the station house. A single staircase also leads to the southwestern corner of 45th Road and 23rd Street. It is signposted as serving only the Flushing Line station, as opposed to all three stations of the complex.

The station house formerly had two more staircases leading to either eastern corner, as well as another staircase to the northwestern corner. In June 2011, they were replaced by the in-system transfer to the underground platforms, which added a new staircase to the former southeast corner of the intersection. As part of the project, a short strip of 45th Road between 23rd Street and Jackson Avenue was de-mapped, while the adjacent Albert Short Triangle was renovated.

In the early 20th century, there were requests for an additional entrance from 23rd Street at the north end of the station, but this was never constructed.

Gallery

IND Queens Boulevard Line platforms

The Court Square–23rd Street station on the IND Queens Boulevard Line is an underground station with two tracks and two side platforms. It is located along 44th Drive between 21st and 23rd Streets and is the westernmost station on the line in Queens. Going by railroad directions, Court Square–23rd Street is the Queens Boulevard Line's southernmost station in Queens. 23rd Street–Ely Avenue opened on August 28, 1939.

The platform walls have a scarlet lake trim line with a dark olive border and mosaic name tablets reading "23RD ST. – ELY AVE." in white sans serif letting on a dark olive background and scarlet lake border. Below the trim line are small tile captions alternating between "23RD" and "ELY" in white on black, and directional signs in the same style are present below some of the name tablets. Red I-beam columns run along both platforms at regular intervals with alternating ones having the standard black station name plate in white lettering.

There are four ceramic mosaic/relief murals on the two platforms and connecting mezzanines, made by Frank Olt in 1992. Each one has an individual title according to nearby plaques. Collectively they are known as the Temple Quad Reliefs.

Exits 
This station has three entrances and exits; the full-time one is at the extreme geographical east end. A single staircase from each platform leads up to a crossover. On the Manhattan-bound side, there is a turnstile bank to a staircase and an elevator to the Manhattan-bound platform from the northeastern corner of 23rd Street and 44th Drive. The entrance was renovated and the elevator was added as part of the construction of the Skyline Tower at the northeast corner of this intersection. There is a little wheelchair ramp and a 3-step staircase that connects the Manhattan-bound platform to the new staircase and elevator entrance. Originally, there was one exit-only turnstile and one full-height turnstile from the crossover to a single staircase that went up to the same corner, but it was demolished when the current entrance to the corner was built.

The long passageway to the IND Crosstown Line platform extends to the south, past the crossover. Prior to the construction of the passageway, this exit contained a full-time token booth and staircases to both sides of 44th Drive.

This station's second fare control area is at the station's extreme western end. A single staircase from each platform goes up to a raised crossover split in two by a steel fence. The Manhattan-bound side has a turnstile bank, token booth, and one staircase going up to the northeastern corner of 21st Street and 44th Drive while the Queens-bound side has two exit-only turnstiles and one staircase going up to the southeastern corner of the same intersection. All fare control areas have their original IND-style directional mosaics.

Gallery

IND Crosstown Line platform

The Court Square station, previously called Long Island City−Court Square station, is the northernmost station on the IND Crosstown Line and the northern terminal for G trains at all times. Although G service terminates here, the tracks themselves continue north and merge with the 60th Street Tunnel Connection to form the IND Queens Boulevard Line's local tracks just south of Queens Plaza. This section of the tracks are not used in regular service, though until April 19, 2010, trains traveled over this connection to continue to Forest Hills–71st Avenue at various times of the day. Just south of the station, the two tracks split into three, then merge again into two tracks. The third track is used to switch trains between track directions.

This underground station, opened on August 19, 1933, has one island platform between two tracks. Each track wall has a green trim line with a black border and small "COURT SQ" tile captions below it in white lettering on black background. Green I-beam columns run along both sides of the platform at regular intervals.

Exits 
Three staircases from the platform go up to the full length mezzanine above and a passageway within fare control connects the station to the Queens Boulevard platform. All fare control areas are unstaffed, containing just full height turnstiles. The main fare control area has a single staircase that goes up to the southwest corner of Jackson Avenue and Court Square West, and a staircase to the north side of Jackson Avenue at Thompson Avenue in front of One Court Square. There was previously a street stair to the southeast corner of Court Square West and Jackson Avenue and another to the southwest corner of Pearson Street and Jackson Avenue; the latter is currently used as employee space.

After the IND 63rd Street Line was connected to the Queens Boulevard Line in December 2001, during a project known as the "63rd Street Connector", another unstaffed entrance was added to the south end of the mezzanine at 45th Road. This was done to allow an out-of-system transfer to the IRT Flushing Line. From this fare control area, a single staircase goes up to the north side of Jackson Avenue at Pearson Street directly outside the staircases to the IRT station. A second staircase to the southwest corner of the intersection no longer exists. In June 2011, this transfer was replaced by an enclosed in-system transfer that consists of two escalators, one elevator, and one staircase connecting both stations.

Gallery

Nearby points of interest 

The P.S. 1 Contemporary Art Center (MoMA PS1) is nearby at 46th and Jackson Avenues. The One Court Square building, owned by Citicorp, sits right above the station as well. Queens County Criminal Court is directly on Court Square, just east of Jackson Avenue.

The site of the 5 Pointz building at Jackson Avenue and Davis Street, which was famously covered in graffiti until its demolition in 2014, is visible just south of the Flushing Line station and can be seen by passing  trains.

The station sits in the center of the Hunters Point Historic District, and  many historic buildings can be found near the station. However, the area right around the station is also seeing a revitalization, with high-rise residential condominiums and rental buildings being built in the area, and upscale restaurants being built near the train station. In addition, there is a bourgeoning art community due to the presence of MoMA PS1 and 5 Pointz. There is also a  supermarket proposed for the area.

References

External links 

nycsubway.org

 
 
 

The Subway Nut

 The Subway Nut — 23rd Street–Ely Avenue Pictures 
 The Subway Nut — Court Square Pictures 
 The Subway Nut — Court Square (7) Pictures 

Other

 MTA's Arts For Transit — 23rd Street–Ely Avenue/Long Island City–Court Square 
 Forgotten NY — Subway Signs That Remember... 
 Station Reporter — Court Square Complex

Google Maps Street View

 23rd Street entrance 
 Entrance to Citibank 
 21st Street entrance 
 45th Road entrance 
 Court Square entrance
 Thomson Avenue entrance 
 Jackson Avenue entrance
 IRT platforms
 Crosstown Line platform
 Queens Boulevard Line platforms

IND Queens Boulevard Line stations
IRT Flushing Line stations
IND Crosstown Line stations
New York City Subway stations in Queens, New York
New York City Subway terminals
New York City Subway transfer stations
Long Island City
1916 establishments in New York City
1933 establishments in New York City
1939 establishments in New York City
Railway stations in the United States opened in 1916
Railway stations in the United States opened in 1933
Railway stations in the United States opened in 1939
National Register of Historic Places in Queens, New York
Railway and subway stations on the National Register of Historic Places in New York City